The Sagar Prahari Bal (SPB) meaning Ocean Sentinel Force, is a unit of the Indian Navy, formed in March 2009, which is entrusted with the responsibility of patrolling India's coastal waters.  The force consists of 2,000 personnel and is equipped with 80 patrol boats. The force was constituted after the Mumbai terror attacks and the main duty of the force is to guard against such terrorist attacks by patrolling the coastline and also to conduct search and rescue operations. The soldiers are trained at INS Shivaji, a naval training and engineering base, near Lonavla.

The SPB maintains security at all major and minor ports in India and carries out round the clock patrolling and is also part of search and rescue operations in times of emergency.

Arms and Equipment
The arms and ammunition used by the Sagar Prahari Bal is manufactured by the Indian Ordnance Factories functioning under the Ministry of Defence.
AKM
IWI Tavor TAR-21
Glock
Sig P226
MP5
INSAS

See also
 Solas Marine Fast Interceptor Boat
 Indian Navy
 Military of India
 Indian Naval Academy
 Indian Coast Guard

References

Indian Navy
Maritime security of India